The 1872 City of Nelson by-election was a by-election held on 27 May 1872 in the  electorate during the 5th New Zealand Parliament.

The by-election was caused by the resignation of the incumbent MP Martin Lightband.

The by-election was won by David Luckie.

His victory was described as a victory for the government; his opponents were James Crowe Richmond and Alfred Saunders.

Results
The following table gives the election result:

References

Nelson 1872
1872 elections in New Zealand
Politics of Nelson, New Zealand